Lymnastis is a genus of ground beetles of the subfamily Trechinae.

Body-color is yellow and flat. Representatives of this genus are characterized by the following features:
Head is small and narrow;
Compound eyes are usually large and are made up of about ten of the facet cells;
Frontal supraorbital notch is reduced;
Prischitkovaya groove on top is not bent;
The elytron have fine hairs and have no return grooves;
Vertex of the Abdomen appears from the elytron;
The upper body is covered in soft hairs.

Species
These 46 species belong to the genus Lymnastis:

 Lymnastis adventitius (Péringuey, 1896)  (South Africa)
 Lymnastis americanus Darlington, 1934  (Cuba)
 Lymnastis angelinii Magrini, 2010  (Italy)
 Lymnastis assmanni Magrini & Wrase, 2013  (Israel)
 Lymnastis atricapillus Bates, 1892  (Myanmar, Oceania)
 Lymnastis barbieri Straneo, 1953  (Vietnam)
 Lymnastis brooksi Baehr, 2008  (Australia)
 Lymnastis coomani Jeannel, 1932  (Thailand and Vietnam)
 Lymnastis decorsei Jeannel, 1932  (worldwide)
 Lymnastis dieneri Szekessy, 1938  (Slovakia, Hungary, and Croatia)
 Lymnastis foveicollis G.Müller, 1941  (Ethiopia)
 Lymnastis galilaeus Piochard de la Brûlerie, 1876  (worldwide)
 Lymnastis gaudini Jeannel, 1929  (Canary Islands)
 Lymnastis gomerae Franz, 1965  (Canary Islands)
 Lymnastis herlanti Basilewsky, 1951  (Democratic Republic of the Congo)
 Lymnastis indicus (Motschulsky, 1851)  (India and Myanmar)
 Lymnastis inops Darlington, 1962  (New Guinea and Papua)
 Lymnastis jeanneli Basilewsky, 1951  (Democratic Republic of the Congo)
 Lymnastis leleupi Basilewsky, 1949  (Democratic Republic of the Congo)
 Lymnastis lesnei Jeannel, 1932  (D.R. Congo, Rwanda, and Mozambique)
 Lymnastis luigionii Dodero, 1899  (Italy)
 Lymnastis macrops Jeannel, 1932  (worldwide)
 Lymnastis meersmanae Basilewsky, 1951  (Democratic Republic of the Congo)
 Lymnastis minutus Basilewsky, 1953  (Democratic Republic of the Congo)
 Lymnastis niloticus Motschulsky, 1862  (worldwide)
 Lymnastis novikovi Mikhailov, 1998  (Ukraine)
 Lymnastis paladinii Magrini, 2010  (Italy)
 Lymnastis pilosus Bates, 1892  (worldwide)
 Lymnastis poggii Magrini, 2010  (Romania)
 Lymnastis pullulus Motschulsky, 1862  (India)
 Lymnastis remyi Jeannel, 1949  (Madagascar)
 Lymnastis rugegeiensis Basilewsky, 1953  (Rwanda and Burundi)
 Lymnastis sanctaehelenae Basilewsky, 1972  (St. Helena)
 Lymnastis scaritides Bruneau de Miré, 1965  (Democratic Republic of the Congo)
 Lymnastis schachti Baehr, 2003  (Senegal/ Gambia)
 Lymnastis schoutedeni Jeannel, 1937  (Democratic Republic of the Congo)
 Lymnastis schuelkei Magrini & Wrase, 2012  (Albania)
 Lymnastis sinaiticus Schatzmayr, 1936  (Egypt)
 Lymnastis subovatus Machado, 1992  (Canary Islands)
 Lymnastis sugimotoi Habu, 1975  (Japan)
 Lymnastis swaluwenbergi Jeannel, 1932  (Hawaii)
 Lymnastis tesquorum Arnoldi & Kryzhanovskij, 1964  (Kazakhstan and Russia)
 Lymnastis thoracicus Machado, 1992  (Canary Islands)
 Lymnastis tibesticus Bruneau de Miré, 1990  (Chad)
 Lymnastis villiersi Bruneau de Miré, 1965  (Democratic Republic of the Congo)
 Lymnastis yanoi Nakane, 1963  (Japan)

References

Trechinae